"Poor Fool" is a 1961 song by Ike & Tina Turner

Poor Fool may also refer to:

"Poor Fool," a 2017 song by 2 Chainz featuring Swae Lee from Pretty Girls Like Trap Music 
Poor Fool, a character in The Good Earth, a novel by Pearl S. Buck 
Poor Fool, a 1930 novel by Erskine Caldwell
"Poor Fool, He Makes Me Laugh", an aria from the opera-in-opera Il Muto

See also
"Poor Little Fool"
"Poor Misguided Fool"